Garra parastenorhynchus is a species of cyprinid fish in the genus Garra endemic to Bhutan.

References 

Garra
Fish described in 2016